Derek John Walker (born 23 November 1959) is a New Zealand cricket umpire and former player. He was a member of the International Panel of Umpires and Referees until June 2016, when he was demoted to New Zealand's national panel.

See also
 List of One Day International cricket umpires
 List of Twenty20 International cricket umpires
 List of Otago representative cricketers

References

1959 births
Living people
New Zealand cricketers
New Zealand cricket umpires
New Zealand One Day International cricket umpires
New Zealand Twenty20 International cricket umpires
Otago cricketers
Cambridgeshire cricketers